Kakerdaja Bog is a bog in Järva County, Estonia. This bog is part of Epu-Kakerdi Wetland Massive.

The area of the bog is about 1000 ha.May 2022

Gallery

References

Järva County
Bogs of Estonia